Erendiz is a feminine Turkish given name. In Turkish, "Erendiz" means "Jupiter".

Real people

 Erendiz Atasü, a Turkish author (see Turkish Wikipedia article).

External links
 Personal homepage of Erendiz Atasü

Turkish feminine given names